First Yaya is a Philippine television drama series broadcast by GMA Network. It aired on the network's Telebabad line up and worldwide via GMA Pinoy TV from February 27, 2023 to June 16, 2023, replacing Maria Clara at Ibarra.

Series overview

Episodes

References

Lists of Philippine drama television series episodes